Chaim of Volozhin (also known as Chaim ben Yitzchok of Volozhin or Chaim Ickovits; January 21, 1749 – June 14, 1821) was a rabbi, Talmudist, and ethicist. Popularly known as "Reb Chaim Volozhiner" or simply as "Reb Chaim", he was born in Volozhin (a.k.a. Vałožyn or Valozhyn) when it was a part of the Polish–Lithuanian Commonwealth. He died there while it was under the control of the Russian Empire.

Student of the Vilna Gaon
Both Chaim and his elder brother Simcha (d. 1812) studied under Rabbi Aryeh Leib ben Asher Gunzberg, the author of the Shaagas Aryeh, who was then rabbi of Volozhin, and afterward under Rabbi Raphael ha-Kohen, (the author of the Toras Yekusiel), later of Hamburg.

Aged 25, Chaim became a disciple of Vilna Gaon. Using his new teacher's method, he began his studies anew, returning to Torah, Mishnah, Talmud, and Hebrew grammar. His admiration for the gaon was boundless, and after his death Chaim virtually acknowledged no superior (see Heschel Levin's "Aliyyot Eliyahu", pp. 55–56, Vilna, 1889 ).

Establishing the Volozhin Yeshiva

It was with the view of applying the methods of the Vilna Gaon that Chaim founded the Volozhin yeshiva, then called Yeshivat Etz Chaim, in 1795, a yeshiva that remained in operation for almost 100 years until it was closed in 1892. The yeshiva became the "mother of all Lithuanian-style yeshivas". He began with ten pupils, young residents of Volozhin, whom Chaim maintained at his own expense. It is related that his wife sold her jewelry to contribute to their maintenance. 

The fame of the institution spread, and the number of its students increased, necessitating an appeal to which the Jews of Russia generously responded. Rabbi Chaim lived to see his yeshiva housed in its own building, and to preside over a hundred disciples ("Chut ha-Meshullash," responsum No. 5, published by his great-grandson ). He saw one of his students establish his own yeshiva, Mir yeshiva.

Chaim continued to teach the Vilna Gaon's study method of penetrating analysis of the Talmudic text, seeking to elicit the intent and meaning of the writing of the Rishonim. This approach was followed by all the great Lithuanian yeshivas, such as Slobodka yeshiva, Mir yeshiva, Ponevezh yeshiva, Kelm yeshiva, Kletsk yeshiva, and Telz yeshiva.

Works

Chaim's major work is the Nefesh Ha-Chaim ("Living Soul").  It deals with complex understandings of the nature of God, but also with secrets of prayer and the importance of Torah, and the purpose being "to implant the fear of God, Torah, and pure worship into the hearts of the upright who are seeking the ways of God". It presents a clear and orderly kabbalistic Weltanschauung that addresses many of the same issues as the Hasidic texts of the day. The work is generally viewed as the Lithuanian response to Hasidism, albeit in a much less harsh manner than the criticisms of Hasidim voiced by Rav Chaim's predecessors such as the Vilna Gaon and Rav Yechezkel Landau. Norman Lamm described its structure:

In addition, Chaim wrote Ruach Chaim, published posthumously. It is a commentary on Pirkei Avoth. Both titles also play on his name, "Chaim". Thus, for example, "The Spirit of Life" can also be translated as "Chaim's Spirit" or "Chaim's Soul".

Many of Chaim's responsa on halakhic subjects were lost by fire in 1815.

Family

Chaim's brother, known as Zalman of Volozhin, is considered to have been among the greatest students of the Vilna Gaon. Zalman of Volozhin's biography, the hagiographical Toldos Adam, includes many anecdotes related to the author by Rabbi Chaim. Rabbi Chaim's son, Yitzchak, took over the leadership of the yeshiva upon his father's death in 1821. Yitzchak's daughter, Rivka, was married to Rabbi Eliezer Yitzchak Fried, her first cousin.  (Eliezer Yitzchak's mother, Esther, was Yitzchak's sister.) Another of Yitzchak's daughters married Naftali Zvi Yehuda Berlin aka the "Netziv". Among Rabbi Chaim's descendants are the Soloveitchik family, such as his great-grandson Yosef Dov Soloveitchik.

Chaim's great-great-grandson, Shimon Peres, was a major political and military figure in Israel who served as both President and Prime Minister of Israel.

References

External links
  Benjamin Brown, '“But Me No Buts”: The Theological Debate Between the Hasidim and the Mitnagdim in Light of the Discourse-Markers Theory'
JewishGen
 Raphael Shuchat, https://www.academia.edu/68949584/R_Hayyim_of_Volozhin_and_Hasidism

1749 births
1821 deaths
People from Valozhyn
Belarusian Orthodox rabbis
Volozhin rosh yeshivas
18th-century Polish–Lithuanian rabbis
19th-century rabbis from the Russian Empire